is one of 24 wards of Osaka, Japan.

History
 April 1, 1925: The area that became Higashinari-ku was incorporated into Osaka as part of the second major expansion of the city. The ward was created from the former district of Higashinari-gun, but not including the area that was previously Sumiyoshi-gun.
 October 1, 1932: A portion was split off to create Asahi-ku.
 April 1, 1943: Jōtō-ku and Ikuno-ku were split off.
In 1925, Higashinari-ku was a vast ward covering most of northeastern Osaka. By 1943 however, it had become one of the smallest wards second only to Naniwa-ku, after two re-drawings of its boundaries. Nevertheless, its population density is still the fourth highest among the wards of Osaka, after Jōtō-ku, Nishi-ku, and Abeno-ku.

Economy

Company headquarters
 Olfa

Railway stations
Osaka Metro
Chuo Line: Midoribashi Station - Fukaebashi Station
Sennichimae Line: Imazato Station - Shin-Fukae Station
Imazatosuji Line: Midoribashi Station - Imazato Station

Education

The ward has a North Korean school, Middle Osaka Korean Elementary School (中大阪朝鮮初級学校).

References

External links

Official website of Higashinari 

 
Wards of Osaka